In baseball and softball, a tag out, sometimes just called a tag, is a play in which a baserunner is out because a fielder touches him with the ball or with the hand or glove holding the ball, while the ball is live and the runner is in jeopardy of being put out – usually when he is not touching a base.

A baserunner is in jeopardy when any of the following are true:

 he is not touching a base (excluding overrunning of first base or when advancing to an awarded base, such as on a base on balls);
 he is touching a base he has been forced to vacate because the batter became a baserunner (a forced runner)
 he has not tagged up on a caught fly ball;
 he failed to touch a base when he last passed it, or failed to touch them in order; or
 he is touching a base that a preceding baserunner is also touching (excludes touching a base he was forced to advance to, in which case the preceding baserunner is in jeopardy unless also forced to advance to an awarded base)

A tag is therefore the most common way to retire baserunners who are not in danger of being forced out, though a forced runner may be tagged out in lieu of stepping on the forced base. Additionally, a tag out can be used on an appeal play.

Runners attempting to advance are sometimes thrown out, which means that a fielder throws the ball to someone covering the base, who then tags the runner before the runner touches the base.  A runner who leads off a base too far might be picked off; that is, the pitcher throws to a fielder covering the base, who then tags the runner out.

When a runner is tagged out, a farther advanced runner who had been forced to advance no longer has to do so. For example, when a sharply hit ball is caught on one hop by the first baseman, he might immediately tag out the runner at first who is forced to advance to second; but when this is done a runner already at second is no longer forced to advance to third base. The result of such a tag is called "removing the force".

If a defensive player tags the runner with his glove and the baseball is in his other hand, or with his free hand while the baseball is in his glove, then the runner is not out.

See also 

 Run out
 Tag (game)

References

Baseball rules
Baseball terminology
Baseball plays